The Wenrus Restaurant Group is a company operating the Wendy's restaurant chain in Russia.

Corporate information

The Wenrus Restaurant Group is an affiliate of Food Service Capital. Food Service Capital's businesses include:
 Arpikom, a company that owns and operates 28 restaurants under the brands Goodman Steak House, Filimonova and Yankel, Kolbasoff and Mama's Pasta)
 Komfis, a catering company
 Legion and Yedinaya Set Pitania, a food delivery service
Iskander Makhmudov owns Food Service Capital, along with Mikhail Zelman and their business partners.

History

In August 2011, the first Wendy's restaurant opened in Russia. Wendy's/Arby's International and Wenrus are planning to develop 180 restaurants over the next 10 years in Russia. Each restaurant will contain a Wendy's and Arby's.

Future plans

Wenrus Restaurant Group plans to open 192 restaurants in the country by 2020, involving a total investment of $132 million, with a plan to invest $40 million in the first five years. According to Alexandra Boeva, an external spokeswoman for Wenrus, the first 50 restaurants will be opened by 2015.

See also

Iskander Makhmudov
Wendy's restaurants
Wendy's/Arby's International

References

Restaurants in Russia
Food and drink companies based in Moscow